Portobello Pier was a pleasure pier opened in Portobello, Edinburgh, Scotland. The final construction costs were £10,000.

History 
In 1869, Parliament passed a Bill for the erection of a pier at Portobello with the view of developing and promoting the town "as a place of pleasure and enjoyment to its inhabitants and to the many visitors from Edinburgh and from afar".  It opened on 23 May 1871. In August of that year, on the holiday to mark the centenary of the birth of Sir Walter Scott, over 2500 people visited the pier, at a cost of one penny. The success of the pier saw day-trippers come by train from all over southern Scotland to Portobello.  Pleasure boat excursions to the Isle of May, Elie, North Berwick, and Bass Rock were also offered. However, the fact that the pier was open on a Sunday caused controversy. In 1892, the pier changed ownership when the North British Railway Company bought the Galloway Company, maintaining steamer services from the pier until the Forth fleet was requisitioned by the Government for the World War I, leading to the closure of the pier.

Along with falling into disuse, the pier was also damaged by storms and the iron supports of the pier corroded, which led to its demolition in 1917.

Attempted revivals 
In 1933, Plans were drawn up by a group of private entrepreneurs to build a new pier which would have connected the existing promenade with three gangways opposite Bath Street, Melville Street, and Wellington Street respectively. The plans included an enclosed bathing pond, enclosed boating and sand space, restaurants, shops, and a concert hall as well as facilities for pleasure steamer services. Construction was planned at an estimated cost of £60,000, but proposals were rejected by the town council. The plans were eventually abandoned due to World War II.

In 2015, a proposal was made to build a new pier on the original site. Big Things on the Beach Trust and Architecture firm Smith Scott Mullan Associates presented plans for a multi-function pier with performance and live events space, a cafe, meeting rooms, and facilities for sports clubs.

References

Piers in Scotland
1871 establishments in Scotland
Buildings and structures demolished in 1917
Demolished buildings and structures in Scotland